João Francisco Capindica (born 12 January 1971) is an Angolan former sprinter. He competed in the men's 400 metres at the 1992 Summer Olympics.

References

External links
 

1971 births
Living people
Athletes (track and field) at the 1992 Summer Olympics
Angolan male sprinters
Olympic athletes of Angola
Place of birth missing (living people)